Batiki is an island of Fiji belonging to the Lomaiviti Archipelago.  The island is of volcanic origin, with a land area of about 12 square kilometers.  Its latitude is 17° 47' S; its longitude is 179° 9' W.

Its population of approximately 300 Fijians lives in coastal villages. The economic activity is subsistence farming and fishing.
The island has no airport or roads, transport consists of simple punt vessels or fibreglass boats. There is a primary school on the island with the population of approx. 50 local students and 4 teachers. There is also a nursing station manned by a registered staff nurse. Critical cases are referred either to Qarani Health Centre or Levuka Hospital. The nursing station opening hours are from 8:00 am to 4:30 pm on a daily basis but is also on standby after hours in case of emergencies.
There are four villages in the island Yavu, Naigani, Mua, and Manuku. Mua village is home to the island pastor, the health clinic center, a single flat-primary school building with a boarding facility and playground.

Economy
Economic activity consists of subsistence farming, and fishing, with fish being sold to the markets in Suva. The island is also the location of Bula Batiki coconut oil, a product made from the island's bountiful coconut palms.

The island has no airport, so most transport is by local cargo vessels, small fibreglass boats, or via a shipping franchise that services the Lomaiviti group on a monthly basis.

References 

Islands of Fiji
Lomaiviti Province